Catherine Bohan (born 18 April 1964) is an Irish swimmer. She competed in three events at the 1980 Summer Olympics.

References

External links
 

1964 births
Living people
Irish female swimmers
Olympic swimmers of Ireland
Swimmers at the 1980 Summer Olympics
Place of birth missing (living people)